Phaeobacter inhibens is a bacterium from the genus of Phaeobacter which has been isolated from seawater from Galicia in Spain.

References

Further reading 
 

Rhodobacteraceae
Bacteria described in 2006